Oakridge Cemetery is a cemetery located in the village of Hillside, near Chicago. It is the largest non-sectarian mausoleum in Cook County, Illinois.

The cemetery is located at 4301 West Roosevelt Road, Hillside, IL 60162.

Notable burials
 Beverly Blossom – (1926–2014)
 Milton R. Brunson, gospel singer (1929–1997)
 Chester Burnett, aka Howlin' Wolf – (1910–1976)
 Colonel Daniel Cameron – (1828–1879)
 James Carter of James Carter and the Prisoners – (1926–2003)
 Tyrone Davis – (1938–2005)
 Harold Gray – (1894–1968)
 Erv Lange – (1887–1971)
 Bob Reynolds, American football player – (1939–1996)
 Jimmy Slagle – (1873–1956)
 Tuffy Stewart – (1883–1934)
 Darryl Stingley – (1951–2007)

References

External links
 Official site

Cemeteries in Cook County, Illinois